
Mount Northover is located on the border of Alberta and British Columbia on the Continental Divide. The nearest higher peak is Mount Lyautey,  to the north-northeast. It was named in 1917 after Lieutenant A.W. Northover, M.C., one of western Canada's first war heroes. Having recently migrated there from the United_Kingdom, and starting a new family there.

A Boer War veteran, Northover enlisted at Regina in the North-West Battalion. He served with the 28th Battalion, C.E.F., and was awarded the Military Cross for action taken on Oct. 8, 1915. In 1916 he returned to Canada on a speaking tour, visiting relatives in Edmonton.

Climate
Based on the Köppen climate classification, Mount Northover is located in a subarctic climate zone with cold, snowy winters, and mild summers. Temperatures can drop below −20 °C with wind chill factors below −30 °C.

See also
 List of peaks on the British Columbia–Alberta border

References

External links
 Mount Northover weather: Mountain Forecast

Two-thousanders of Alberta
Two-thousanders of British Columbia
Canadian Rockies